The People's Republic of Congo Air Force was the air force of the  Republic of the Congo from 1970-1992.

Aircraft

Inventory from 1960-1992

References 

Military history of the Republic of the Congo
Air forces by country